Dasari Yoganand (16 April 1922 – 23 November 2006) was a South Indian film director.

Early life
Yoganand was born in Madras under British India. His parents were Venkata Das, estate manager under Nawaab Raza Ali Khan of Machilipatnam, and Lakshmi Bai. He became a photographer. He was interested in playing and directing dramas and came close to Tungala Chalapathi Rao and Yadavalli Nageswara Rao in Machilipatnam. He went to Bangalore, trained in Radiology, and he went to Madras in 1939 to help his father. Yoganand joined Jiten Benarjee of Newtone Studios after his father's death and later worked with famous cinematographer M. A. Rehman.

He participated in the Quit India Movement of 1942. In the Indian Freedom Movement, he came close to Congress leaders like Rajagopalachari, Tanguturi Prakasam and Bulusu Sambamurthi.

Film career
Yoganand worked as an associate to Gudavalli Ramabrahmam and L. V. Prasad. He worked in Samsaram directed by L.V. Prasad.  In 1943, he joined Manikyam as an editor for the film Mayalokam and also worked as an assistant director to Gudavalli Ramabrahmam. He worked for Bhakta Tulasidas by Lanka Satyam in Salem for three years.

His debut film was Ammalakkalu (Telugu) and Marumagal (Tamil) by Leena Chettiar in 1953. He became the in-house filmmaker for his Krishna Pictures and made many box-office successes including the Madurai Veeran (1956) which sowed the seeds for M. G. Ramachandran to be projected as more than a mere good-looking hero.

After working with Yoganand, N. T. Rama Rao offered to let him direct Thodu Dongalu (1954). He also wrote the story for the film, which received many awards including a merit certificate from the President of India and an award in the China Film Festival. NTR gave him a second chance in his next film Jayasimha which became a blockbuster.

He directed about 50 films in Telugu and Tamil languages; among them N. T. Rama Rao had the lead role in 17 films. His films include Thodu Dongalu, Ilavelpu, Kodalu Diddina Kapuram, Ummadi Kutumbam, Muga Nomu, Jai Jawan, Vemulavada Bheema Kavi, Kathanayakuni Katha, Dabbuku Lokam Dasoham, Jayasimha, Vade Veedu, Thodu Dongalu, Thikka Shankarayya and Pelli Sandadi. He had the unique distinction of directing all the top stars, both in Telugu and Tamil film fields such as N. T. Rama Rao, Akkineni Nageswara Rao, Relangi, Bhanumathi Ramakrishna, Savitri, Padmini, Vyjayanthimala, Jayalalitha, Pandari Bai, B. Saroja Devi, Devika, Sivaji Ganesan, M. G. Ramachandran, Gemini Ganesan, S. S. Rajendran and M. N. Nambiar, K. Balaji.

He died of a heart attack in Chennai.

Filmography

Awards
National Film Awards
 1954: Certificate of Merit for Best Feature Film in Telugu - Thodu Dongalu
 1960: President's Silver Medal for Best Feature Film in Tamil - Parthiban Kanavu
Other Awards
 His Ummadi Kutumbam (1967) film was selected for screening at Moscow Film Festival.
 Kalaimamani Award from Government of Tamil Nadu in 1981.

References

External links
 

Telugu film directors
Tamil film directors
1922 births
2006 deaths
20th-century Indian film directors
Film directors from Chennai
Hindi film cinematographers